Sport in Moldova has reached international levels as individuals compete at the European, World and Olympic levels. Most notably, Moldova has won a range of medals at the European championships in boxing, Judo, weightlifting and wrestling.

Sports

Basketball 

Moldova has an increasingly successful team at the FIBA European Championship for Small Countries. There, Moldova has won two silver medals (in 2008 and 2012)

The country has a professional basketball league, the Moldovan National Division.

Cycling 
The most prestigious cycling race is the Moldova President's Cup, which was first run in 2004.

Football 

Football is the most popular sport in Moldova.

Rugby 

Rugby union is becoming more popular. Since 2004, the number of players at all levels has doubled to 3,200. Despite the hardships and deprivations the national team are ranked 34th in the world. More than 10,000 supporters turn out for home internationals.

Wrestling 
Trânta (a form of wrestling) is the national sport in Moldova.

Major achievements by sporting event

Olympic Games

Paralympic Games

Youth Olympic Games

World Championships

World Games

European Championships

European Games

See also
 Football in Moldova
 Moldova at the Olympics
 Rugby union in Moldova

References

External links

 Sports.md – all about Moldovan sport (Все о спорте в Молдове)
 – Moldavian First Football Division